A Tribe Called Quest was an American hip hop group, formed in 1985. They released six studio albums, five compilations, sixteen singles and two extended plays. The group was made up of rapper/main producer Q-Tip (Kamaal Ibn John Fareed, formerly Jonathan Davis), the late rapper Phife Dawg (Malik Taylor) and DJ/co-producer Ali Shaheed Muhammad. Phife Dawg was only persuaded to join when a fourth member, rapper Jarobi White, joined the group. In 1989 they signed a demo deal with Geffen Records, but not given a full-fledged recording contract. After receiving many offers, they opted for the Jive Records label, an independent rap label. In under a year, they managed to produce People's Instinctive Travels and the Paths of Rhythm to a lukewarm reception, reaching #91 on the Billboard 200, though it did achieve gold certification by the Recording Industry Association of America (RIAA).

Their next album, The Low End Theory, helped shape alternative hip-hop in the 1990s. It established a link between their hip hop based music and the jazz genre. It was a large success, and, on February 1, 1995, the RIAA certified the album platinum. Their following album, Midnight Marauders, released in 1993, also earned the platinum award. Beats, Rhymes and Life, their subsequent album which was released three years after Midnight Marauders, was considered their darkest work. It lacked the positive and joyful vibe present in their previous albums. Their fifth studio album followed, The Love Movement. It was regarded by critics as returning to the group's positive vibe. It was awarded gold by the RIAA on November 1, 1998. Their sixth and final album, We Got It from Here... Thank You 4 Your Service, was released on November 11, 2016, with posthumous contributions from Phife Dawg. On May 22, 2017, the album was certified gold by the RIAA.

Albums

Studio albums

Compilations

Extended plays

Singles

As lead artist

As featured artist

A Did not chart on the Hot 100 or Hot R&B/Hip-Hop charts (Billboard rules at the time prevented album cuts from charting). Chart peak listed here represents Hot 100 Airplay and Hot R&B/Hip-Hop Airplay charts data.

Other charted songs

Guest appearances

Notes

References

External links
A Tribe Called Quest
[ A Tribe Called Quest on Allmusic]

Hip hop discographies
Discographies of American artists
Discography